Takeaki Tsuchiya (born 18 May 1970) is a Japanese equestrian. He competed at the 1996 Summer Olympics and the 2000 Summer Olympics.

References

External links
 

1970 births
Living people
Japanese male equestrians
Olympic equestrians of Japan
Equestrians at the 1996 Summer Olympics
Equestrians at the 2000 Summer Olympics
Sportspeople from Miyazaki Prefecture